Sudanese Postal Services Co. ltd, also known as Sudapost, is the public operator responsible for postal service in Sudan.

See also
 Communications in Sudan

References

External links 

 

Companies of Sudan
Sudan
Philately of Sudan